Teja is a 1992 Telugu thriller film, produced by Ushakiran Movies, and directed by N. Hari Babu. The film won three Nandi Awards

Plot 

This story is about Teja (Tarun), a born genius and multi talented boy who is at his 6th class preparing for 10th class. Being an enthusiast of physics, computers and robots he makes pranks on his peers and mainly on his servant at home. One day he is expelled from the class by his teacher in front of his vice-principal Sarada (Shari) because of his incomplete homework. Though Teja explains well about the subject, he is expelled from the class on the grounds of mischief.

Amazed by his knowledge, Sarada recommends Teja to 10th class. Later Teja befriends a journalist called Jagan, who admires his intelligence and takes his help in several circumstances. One day in a school excursion, Sarada witnesses a murder of a woman done by her ex-husband Vinod. This is unknown to Teja, who is clicking the pictures of nature. Vinod chases them to kill, with a hard run, Sarada manages to reach her bus safely along with Teja. Later, Teja reminds her of her duty as a teacher. Then Sarada gains courage and arrests Vinod. Later Vinod bribes a constable and comes out from the police station illegally and kills Sarada through acid at her school lab. Then at the judgement, Teja submits the secondary evidence i.e. the photograph of murder which he has clicked through his camera unknowingly, then the judge sentences Vinod to death.

Later, Vinod avenges on Teja to kill him and escapes from prison. Meanwhile, at Teja's home with the help of Teja his sister's marriage preparations are done and all went to Tirupati, in confusion, Teja is left at home which is locked. At the same time two thieves enter his house unknowingly (once Teja teaches them a lesson for stealing Jagan's wallet). Meanwhile, Vinod enters Teja's home to escape from cops and is waiting for his arrival to kill him. Unknown of all these facts Teja stays at his home alone with his pet. After lot of chaos they all realise they were in a dangerous play. Vinod ties up the thieves and searches for Teja. Then Teja retorted back with his electronic gadgets and arranges a deadly trap for Vinod to stop him. Then as Vinod is about to kill Teja, cops surround him along with Teja's parents and Jagan. Then Vinod is arrested again.

In the final Teja receives the National Bravery Award.

Awards
Nandi Awards - 1992
 Best Children's Film - Gold - Ramoji Rao
 Best Child Actor - Tarun
 Best Villain - R. V. Prasad

References

1990s Telugu-language films
Indian children's films
Indian crime comedy films
Indian thriller films
1992 films
Films scored by M. M. Keeravani
1990s thriller films